Social constraints are a psychological term that can be defined as "any social condition that causes a trauma survivor to feel unsupported, misunderstood, or otherwise alienated from their social network when they are seeking social support or attempting to express trauma-related thoughts, feelings, or concerns." Social constraints are most commonly defined as negative social interactions which make it difficult for an individual to speak about their traumatic experiences. The term is associated with the social-cognitive processing model, which is a psychological model describing ways in which individuals cope and come to terms with trauma they have experienced. Social constraints have been studied in populations of bereaved mothers, individuals diagnosed with cancer, and suicide-bereaved individuals. There is evidence of social constraints having negative effects on mental health. They have been linked to increased depressive symptoms as well as post-traumatic stress disorder symptoms in individuals who have experienced traumatic events. There seems to be a positive association between social constraints and negative cognitions related to traumatic events. Social constraints have also been linked to difficulties in coping with illness in people who have been diagnosed with terminal illness such as cancer.

Social-Cognitive Processing Model 
The social-cognitive processing model is a psychological model which posits that recovering from a traumatic event involves discussing important thoughts and feelings about the event with others who can provide support and guidance to the affected individual. The social-cognitive model has been discussed as a model to explain thinking patterns which occur in people experiencing being diagnosed with cancer. Receiving a cancer diagnosis can often be a distressing source of news for terminally ill individuals, and the model posits that they often turn to important sources of social support in order to maintain healthy perspectives on self-worth and safety, as well as accurate accounts of the traumatic event which minimize trauma-related negative thoughts. Similarly, social constraints can negatively impact thoughts and feelings related to the negative event by invalidating and minimizing an individual's experience.

Measuring Social Constraints 
In research studies, social constraints have been defined and measured by the Social Constraints Scale (SCS). Items on this measure evaluate social interactions which negatively impact individuals' expression of thoughts and feelings related to traumatic events. Items are assessed over the period of the past month, and questions such as "How often in the past month did your family/friends... minimize your problems?" and "Not seem to understand your situation?"

Effects of Social Constraints 

Social constraints have been studied in populations of bereaved mothers, individuals diagnosed with cancer, and suicide-bereaved individuals. They have been linked to increased symptoms of mental illness and poor coping with terminal illness in these populations. High levels of social constraints are also linked to an increase in negative thoughts or feelings about traumatic events in individuals.

Depression 
Social constraints have been linked to increased depressive symptoms. Researchers found that in a study of bereaved mothers, mothers experiencing social constraints reported more depressive symptoms than mothers who were receiving adequate social support. Presence of social constraints and depressive symptoms were also positively associated in individuals who were in remission from breast cancer.

Post-traumatic Stress Disorder 
Social constraints have also been linked to increased post-traumatic stress disorder symptoms. In a study of breast cancer survivors, individuals experiencing social constraints in the form of being unable to speak to loved ones about their diagnosis were less likely to report gratitude for life, an easy time relating to others, and positive spiritual growth after recovery. A study with trauma survivors revealed that individuals who experienced "inhibiting, invalidating, and/or critical interpersonal reactions to trauma disclosure" were likely to exhibit exacerbated post-traumatic stress symptoms.

Adjustment to Medical Diagnoses 
Research has shown that terminally ill individuals harboring optimistic thoughts and attitudes towards their diagnoses experience fewer social constraints in the form of negative interpersonal interactions with sources of social support. Individuals harboring pessimistic attitudes experienced greater social constraints and lower self-reported mood as a result.

Thoughts and Cognition 
Social constraints may interact with intrusive thoughts and negative cognition. In a study of bereaved mothers, higher levels of social constraints were associated with more intrusive thoughts or worries surrounding their loss, as well as depressive symptoms. Trauma survivors experiencing less supportive social environments were more likely to report thoughts of self-blame and guilt surrounding their traumatic experience.

Future Directions of Research 
There is little research regarding therapeutic work with social constraints in psychological treatment. Further research into the effects of social constraints on mental health can help tailor treatment to individuals' needs, such as referring trauma survivors to support groups or counseling services to target negative thoughts and feelings related to their trauma.

Thus far, research has also largely focused on patients experiencing stressors related to medical diagnoses. Future research areas could expand to include populations experiencing trauma such as vehicular incidents, as well as complex trauma related to sexual assault or adverse childhood experiences.

References 

Wikipedia Student Program
Psychological stress
Interpersonal conflict